The 2020 National Rugby League finals series was a tournament staged to determine the winner of the 2020 Telstra Premiership season. The series was played over four weekends in October, culminating in the 2020 NRL Grand Final on 25 October 2020 at ANZ Stadium. The Grand Final was ultimately won by the second-placed Melbourne Storm, who defeated the minor premiers the Penrith Panthers 26–20.

The top eight teams from the 2020 NRL season qualify for the finals series. NRL finals series have been played under the current format since 2012.

Qualification

Venues and impact of the COVID-19 pandemic 
For the 2020 NRL Finals Series, the stadia will be permitted to hold up to 50% of capacity under New South Wales, Australian Capital Territory and Queensland government guidelines. For the preliminary finals Lang Park's permitted capacity was increased to 75%.

Due to the second wave of the COVID-19 pandemic in Victoria, the Melbourne Storm will play their home finals at Suncorp Stadium in Brisbane rather than their regular home ground of AAMI Park in Melbourne. Suncorp will hold two games, Canberra's GIO Stadium will host one match and Sydney will host the remaining six matches, between ANZ Stadium, Bankwest Stadium, Panthers Stadium and the Sydney Cricket Ground.

Finals structure 

The system used for the 2020 NRL finals series is a final eight system. The top four teams in the eight receive the "double chance" when they play in week-one qualifying finals, such that if a top-four team loses in the first week it still remains in the finals, playing a semi-final the next week against the winner of an elimination final. The bottom four of the eight play knock-out games – only the winners survive and move on to the next week. Home ground advantage goes to the team with the higher ladder position in the first two weeks and to the qualifying final winners in the third week.

In the second week, the winners of the qualifying finals receive a bye to the third week. The losers of the qualifying final plays the elimination finals winners in a semi-final. In the third week, the winners of the semi-finals from week two play the winners of the qualifying finals in the first week. The winners of those matches move on to the Grand Final.

Bracket

Summary

† Match decided in extra time.

Qualifying & elimination finals

1st Qualifying final

1st Elimination final

2nd Qualifying final

2nd Elimination final

Semi-finals

1st Semi-final

2nd Semi-final

Preliminary finals

1st Preliminary Final

2nd Preliminary Final

Grand Final

References 

2020 NRL season
2020 in Australian rugby league